SS Californian was a British Leyland Line steamship. It is thought to have been the only ship to see the Titanic, or at least its rockets, during the sinking, but despite being the closest ship in the area, the crew took no action to assist. The United States Senate inquiry and British Wreck Commissioner's inquiry into the sinking both concluded that the Californian could have saved many or all of the lives that were lost, had a prompt response been mounted to the Titanic distress rockets. The U.S. Senate inquiry was particularly critical of the vessel's captain, Stanley Lord, calling his inaction during the disaster "reprehensible".

Despite this criticism, no formal charges were ever brought against Lord and his crew for their inaction. Lord disputed the findings and would spend the rest of his life trying to clear his name. In 1992, the UK Government's Marine Accident Investigation Branch re-examined the case and while condemning the inaction of the Californian and Captain Lord, also concluded that due to the limited time available, "the effect of Californian taking proper action would have been no more than to place on her the task actually carried out by Carpathia, that is the rescue of those who escaped... [no] reasonably probable action by Captain Lord could have led to a different outcome of the tragedy".

History
Californian was a British steamship owned by the Leyland Line, part of J.P. Morgan's International Mercantile Marine Co. She was constructed by the Caledon Shipbuilding & Engineering Company in Dundee, Scotland, and was the largest ship built in Dundee up to that time. The ship was built to the maximum dimensions that were allowed to moor and outfit her in the Dundee Docks. The ship's size and importance to the local shipbuilding industry meant that there was a lot of local interest in her construction as it progressed. There were also some problems – when both of the ship's boilers were being transported through the streets from a foundry to the shipyard the weight of them (carried on a wheeled bogie) caused considerable damage to the city's roads, as well as breaking a number of underground water pipes. Later when a crane was being used to rig a spar on one of the Californian four masts, the spar became tangled in nearby telephone wires and severed them.

She was designed primarily to transport cotton, but also had the capacity to carry 47 passengers and 55 crew members. The primary clientele was those passengers with too limited the means to travel on board large liners. By offering them comfortable cabins at an affordable prices (£10 per crossing in the direction Liverpool — Boston, £50 in the opposite direction), Leyland Line was able to secure some profits this way. Nonetheless, the ship was still primarily a freighter, as evidenced by her massive bunkers. She was named Californian according to a tradition specific to the company which gave its ships the name of one of the 46 states of the United States at the time.

The accommodation of most of the fifty or so crew members was located below the foredeck. They stayed there in cabins designed for four to eight people that were quite uncomfortable, poorly ventilated and lighted. In all, the crew included the captain, four officers, a radio operator, and 49 crew members (sailors, drivers, trimmers, etc.). The cabins were located in the superstructure. The officers of the crew resided on the starboard side and the passengers on the port side. The facilities for passengers corresponded to the second class of most ships of the time. Although the cabins were not of high quality, they remained comfortable and had electric lighting, which was not the case on all contemporary ships. The passengers of the Californian also had at their disposal a smoking room on the upper starboard deck, decorated with oak panels and linoleum, a novelty at the turn of the century. The dining room was also decorated and comfortable.

Californian was launched on 26 November 1901 and completed her sea trials on 23 January 1902. From 31 January 1902 to 3 March 1902, she made her maiden voyage from Dundee to New Orleans, Louisiana, United States. Subsequently, she made transatlantic crossings, generally carrying around thirty passengers in addition to her cargo. In 1902, she was chartered by the Dominion Line for five crossings to Portland, Maine. She then returned to the Leyland Line service to serve the southern United States. From 1901 to 1911, she was commanded successively by four captains before being finally put under the command of Stanley Lord. By his young age (he obtained his captain's certificate at 24, a very early age compared to many of his colleagues) and by his spirit of initiative and his skills, Lord indeed promised to become a major captain in the British merchant fleet.

Between late 1911 and early 1912, Californian had a Marconi wireless apparatus installed in a refitted cabin. Her first radio operator was Cyril Furmstone Evans.

Sinking of Titanic

On March 30, 1912, the Californian made a stopover in London on a trip to New Orleans during which she had to face a storm which damaged part of her cotton cargo. Stanley Lord, who had commanded Californian since 27 March 1911, was her captain when she left the Royal Albert Dock, Liverpool, England on 5 April 1912 on her way to Boston, Massachusetts. She was not carrying any passengers on this voyage. On the navigation bridge, Lord was accompanied by three officers and an apprentice: George Stewart (second in command or chief officer), Herbert Stone (second officer), Charles Groves (third officer) and apprentice James Gibson.

The first week of the crossing was uneventful. On Sunday 14 April at 18:30 ship's time, Californian only wireless operator, Cyril Furmstone Evans (born 1892 in Croydon, Surrey, United Kingdom), signalled to the Antillian that three large icebergs were five miles to the south. Titanic wireless operator Harold Bride also received the warning and delivered it to the ship's bridge a few minutes later.

Californian encountered a large ice field at 22:20 ship's time, and Captain Lord decided to stop the ship and wait until morning before proceeding further. Before leaving the bridge, he thought he saw a ship's light away to the eastward but could not be sure it was not just a rising star. Lord continued to the engineers' cabins and met with the chief, whom he told about his plans for stopping. As they were talking, they saw a ship's lights approaching. Lord asked Evans if he knew of any ships in the area, and Evans responded: "only the Titanic." Lord asked Evans to inform her that Californian was stopped and surrounded by ice. Lord ordered Evans to warn all other ships in the area, which he did.

Evans's message that SS Californian was stopped and surrounded by ice was heard very strongly on Titanic due to the relative proximity of the two ships and drowned out a separate message Phillips had been in the process of receiving from Cape Race, bringing Phillips to rebuke Evans: "Shut up, shut up! I am busy; I am working Cape Race!". Philips never passed this message to the bridge, but in his defence, Evans had not prefixed the message with the letters, "MSG", which stood for Master Service Gram, as was customary for all messages intended for the bridge. A little bit later Evans, feeling that he had done his duty despite Philips's rude rejection of the message, switched off his wireless equipment and went to bed. One hour and 10 minutes later, at 23:40, Titanic hit an iceberg. Shortly after midnight, she transmitted her first distress call.

Third Officer Charles Groves of the Californian testified to the British inquiry that at 23:10 ship's time, he had seen the lights of another ship come into view 10 or 12 miles away, 3.5 points above Californian starboard beam. At about 23:30, Groves went below to inform Lord. The latter suggested that the ship be contacted by Morse lamp, which was tried, but no reply was seen. To Groves, she was clearly a large liner, as she had multiple decks brightly lit. The ship finally seemed to stop and extinguish her deck lights at 23:40, the same time Titanic stopped her engines. At the British inquiry, Groves agreed that if the ship he saw had turned two points to port, it would have concealed her deck lights.

Slightly after midnight, Second Officer Herbert Stone took watch from Groves. He testified that he, too, observed the ship, judging it to be about five miles away. He tried signalling her with the Morse lamp, also without success. Apprentice officer James Gibson, who had been doing the Morse signalling, testified that at 00:55, Stone told him he had observed five rockets in the sky above the nearby ship. Stone testified that he had informed Captain Lord, although the British inquiry did not ask whether or not he communicated the number. Lord asked if the rockets had been a company signal, but Stone did not know. Lord and Stone both testified that Stone reported they were not distress signals. Lord ordered Stone to tell him if anything about the ship changed, to keep signalling it with the Morse lamp, but did not order that it be contacted by wireless.

Gibson testified that Stone had expressed unease to him about the situation: "A ship is not going to fire rockets at sea for nothing", Stone said. "She looks very queer out of the water—her lights look queer." Gibson observed, "She looks rather to have a big side out of the water", and he agreed that "everything was not all right with her"; that it was "a case of some kind of distress". Stone, however, under questioning by the British inquiry which became more and more incredulous, testified repeatedly that he did not think at the time that the rockets could have been distress signals, and that the possibility did not occur to him until he learned the Titanic had sunk.

By 02:00, the ship appeared to be leaving the area. A few minutes later, Gibson informed Captain Lord as such and that eight white rockets had been seen. Lord asked whether he was sure of the colour. Gibson said yes and left.

At 02:20, Titanic sank. At 03:40, Stone and Gibson, still sharing the middle watch, spotted rockets to the south. They did not see the ship that was firing them, but at about this same time RMS Carpathia was coming quickly from the southeast, firing rockets to let Titanic know that help was on the way. At 04:16, Chief Officer George F. Stewart relieved Stone, and almost immediately noticed, coming into view from the south, a brilliantly-lit, four-masted steamship with one funnel; Carpathia arrived on the scene shortly after 04:00.

Captain Lord woke up at 04:30 and went out on deck to decide how to proceed past the ice to the west. He sent Stewart to wake Evans and find out what happened to the ship they had seen to the south. They subsequently learned from the Frankfurt that the Titanic had sunk overnight. Lord ordered the ship underway. Californian course took her west, slowly passing through the ice field, after which she turned south. Californian was sighted at 06:00 by  steaming from the north. Californian actually passed the Carpathia to the east, then turned, and headed northeast back towards the rescue ship, arriving at 08:30.

Carpathia was just finishing picking up the last of Titanic survivors. After communicating with Californian, Carpathia left the area, leaving Californian to search for any other survivors. However, Californian only found scattered wreckage, empty lifeboats, and corpses, and continued on its route to America. Upon arrival, several key crew members, including Lord and Evans, were summoned to give evidence at the American inquiry. Evans also gave evidence at the British inquiry into the tragedy. Like others involved in the disaster, he was offered large sums of money from newspapers for his story, but he refused it.

Aftermath
As public knowledge grew of the Titanic disaster, questions soon arose about how the disaster occurred, as well as if and how it could have been prevented.

A United States Senate inquiry into the sinking of the RMS Titanic started on 19 April 1912, the day Californian arrived unnoticed in Boston. Initially, the world was unaware of her and her part in the Titanic disaster. On 22 April, the inquiry discovered that a ship near Titanic had failed to respond to the distress signals. The identity of the ship was unknown.

The next day, a small newspaper in New England, The Clinton Daily Item, printed a shocking story claiming that Californian had refused aid to Titanic. The source for the story was Californian carpenter, James McGregor, who stated that he had been close enough to see Titanic lights and distress rockets. On the same day, the Boston American printed a story sourced by Californians assistant engineer, Ernest Gill, which essentially told the same story as the Daily Item.

Captain Lord also spoke with several Boston area newspapers but gave conflicting accounts. In a Boston Traveller article dated 19 April, Lord claimed that his ship was 30 miles from Titanic, but in a Boston Post article dated 24 April, he claimed 20 miles. Lord told the Boston Globe that his ship had spent three hours steaming around the wreck site trying to render assistance, but Third Officer Grove later stated that the search ended after two hours, at 10:40. When reporters asked Lord about his exact position the night of the disaster, he refused to respond, calling such information "state secrets".

After the newspaper revelations on 23 April, the U.S. Senate inquiry issued subpoenas for multiple members of the crew, including Gill and Lord. During his testimony, Gill repeated his claims. Lord's testimony was conflicting and changing. For example, he detailed three totally different ice conditions. He admitted knowing about the rockets (after telling Boston newspapers that his ship had not seen any rockets) but insisted that they were not distress rockets, and they were not fired from Titanic but a small steamship, the so-called "third ship" of the night. Yet the testimony of Captain J. Knapp, U.S. Navy, and a part of the Navy Hydrographer's Office, made clear that Titanic and Californian were in sight of each other, and no third vessel had been in the area.

The so-called "scrap log" of Californian also came under question. This is a log wherein all daily pertinent information is entered before being approved by the captain and entered into the official log. Company policy of International Mercantile Marine Co., the parent of both Leyland Line and the White Star Line, required scrap logs to be destroyed daily. The official log mentioned neither a nearby ship nor rockets. At the British inquiry, Stone was not asked to recall the notations he had actually written in the scrap log, during his bridge-watch between midnight and 4:00 on 15 April.

On 2 May, the British Court of Formal Investigation began. Again, Lord gave conflicting, changing, and evasive testimony. By contrast, Captain Arthur Rostron of Carpathia, at each inquiry, gave consistent and forthright testimony. During the British Inquiry, Rostron was asked to confirm an affidavit he had made to the United States Inquiry. Among the other things in his affidavit, he confirmed that "It was daylight at about 4.20 a.m. At 5 o'clock it was light enough to see all around the horizon. We then saw two steamships to the northwards, perhaps 7 or 8 miles distant. Neither of them was Californian."

During the inquiry, the crew of Californian, like Captain Lord, gave conflicting testimonies. Most notably, Lord said he was not told that the nearby ship had disappeared, contradicting testimony from James Gibson who said he reported it, and Lord had acknowledged him.

Also during the inquiries, Titanic survivors recalled seeing the lights of another ship after Titanic had hit the iceberg. To Titanics Fourth Officer Boxhall, the other ship appeared to be off Titanics bow, five miles (8 km) away and heading in her direction. Just like Californian officers, Boxhall attempted signaling the ship with a Morse lamp, but received no response. However, Titanic lookout Frederick Fleet, who was in the crow's nest when the iceberg was sighted and remained there for another forty minutes, testified at the US inquiry that he did not see the lights of another ship while in the crow's nest. He only saw a light later after leaving the ship on a lifeboat.

Titanics Captain Edward Smith had felt the ship was close enough that he ordered the first lifeboats launched on the port side to row over to the ship, drop off the passengers, and come back to Titanic for more. Moreover, lifeboat occupants reported the other ship's lights were seen from the lifeboats throughout the night; one lifeboat rowed towards them but never seemed to get any closer.

Both the American and British inquires found that Californian must have been closer than the  claimed by Captain Lord, and that each ship was visible from the other. Indeed, when Carpathia arrived at the wreck site, a vessel was clearly seen to the north; this was later identified as Californian. Both inquiries concluded that Captain Lord had failed to provide proper assistance to Titanic, the British Inquiry concluding further Californians responding to Titanics rockets and going to assist "… might have saved many if not all of the lives that were lost".

In the months and years following the disaster, numerous preventive safety measures were enacted. The United States passed the Radio Act of 1912, which required 24-hour radio watch on all ships in case of an emergency. The first International Convention for the Safety of Life at Sea formed a treaty that also required 24-hour radio monitoring and standardized the use of distress rockets.

Despite the criticisms of Lord's conduct, no formal charges were ever brought against him. As a result, he had no right of appeal against the inquiry's findings. The issue was not considered again until the publication of Walter Lord's (unrelated to Captain Lord) book A Night to Remember in 1955 and the release of the 1958 film of the same name prompted Lord to seek a re-hearing of the inquiry relating to his ship, to counter the allegations made in the book and his portrayal in the film. Petitions presented to the UK Government in 1965 and 1968 by the Mercantile Marine Service Association (MMSA), a union to which Captain Lord belonged, failed to get the matter re-examined. However, when the wreck of the Titanic was discovered by Ballard's expedition in 1985, it was found to be 13 miles from its reported position (the location accepted by both inquiries), so the Board of Trade ordered a re-examination.

The British Government's Marine Accident Investigation Branch (MAIB) concluded its reappraisal of evidence in 1992. The conclusions were those of Deputy Chief Inspector, James de Coverly, stating: "What is significant, however, is that no ship was seen by the Titanic until well after the collision… watch was maintained with officers on the bridge and seamen in the crow's nest, and with their ship in grave danger the lookout for another vessel which could come to their help must have been most anxious and keen. It is in my view inconceivable that the Californian or any other ship was within the visible horizon of the Titanic during that period; it equally follows that the Titanic can't have been within the Californian's horizon." The report went on: "More probably, in my view, the ship seen by Californian was another, unidentified, vessel."

The original investigator of the 1992 reappraisal was a Captain Barnett, who unlike de Coverly, concluded "that the Titanic was seen by the Californian and indeed kept under observation from 23:00 or soon after on 14 April until she sank... [based on] the evidence from Captain Lord and the two watch officers, Mr. Grove and Mr. Stone". It was after Barnett's original report was submitted that Captain de Coverly was given the task of further examination. Both Barnett and de Coverly had concluded that Titanic rockets had been seen and that Stone and Lord had not responded appropriately to signals of distress.

The 1992 MAIB report concluded that Captain Lord and his crew's actions "fell far short of what was needed". The report did concede that even if "proper action had been taken", Californian could not have arrived on the scene until "well after the sinking". It also noted that when he did know of Titanic distress, Lord twice took his ship across an ice field to help search for survivors. Captain Lord's chief defender, union attorney, Leslie Harrison, who had led the fight to have the Californian incident re-examined by the British government, called the dual conclusions of the report "an admission of failure to achieve the purpose of the reappraisal".

The 1992 report by the MAIB was published just months after their publication of another controversial report, on the subject of the Marchioness disaster of 1989. This report had led to questions over the evidence-gathering, conduct and judgements of the MAIB.

Author Paul Lee accused Captain Lord of an "inability or unwillingness to adjust to an entirely new situation". Although Lord had stopped his ship upon encountering ice, the British inquiry concluded that if Californian had acted upon the rockets and pushed through the ice, the Californian "might have saved many, if not all, of the lives that were lost". The U.S Senate inquiry was also critical of Lord's inaction, the final report stating that "such conduct, whether arising from indifference or gross carelessness, is most reprehensible, and places upon the commander the Californian a grave responsibility".

Senator William Alden Smith, in a speech to the U.S. Senate inquiry, said: "the failure of Capt. Lord to arouse the wireless operator on his ship, who could have easily ascertained the name of the vessel in distress and reached her in time to avert loss of life, places a tremendous responsibility upon this officer from which it will be very difficult for him to escape". Author Daniel Allen Butler wrote: "The crime of Stanley Lord was not that he may have ignored the Titanic's rockets, but that he unquestionably ignored someone's cry for help."

Others have suggested that, considering all the circumstances, there was actually little if anything the Californian could have done to prevent or reduce the loss of life. Allegations have been made that trade unions defending Captain Lord succeeded in influencing the reports from the official investigations before they were available to the public. Williams and Kamps wrote in Titanic and the Californian: "Bearing [the] distance in mind, and recalling that a mere fifty-five minutes had elapsed from the time Captain Lord was first informed about the rockets to the moment the Titanic slipped beneath the waves, it would have been nothing short of a miracle for Lord to bring his ship to the Titanic and effect a rescue in such a short space of time."

Titanic historian Tim Maltin theorized that the Californian's inaction was the result of a cold water mirage, or superior mirage, arising from differences in air temperature over the warmer waters of the Atlantic Ocean and the colder waters of the Labrador Current. Maltin suggested that this would cause a superior refraction, superimposing and stretching and distorting the edge of the sea and lifting images of objects, distorting their appearance. This would explain why the Titanic Morse lamp was believed to be a flickering oil lamp on the mast of a much smaller ship, and why Capt. Lord thought the Titanic was a different vessel. If correct, Maltin's theory may further explain why the Titanic lookouts did not spot the iceberg earlier.

Cyril Evans continued his service with the Marconi's Wireless Telegraph Company and its successor companies (Eastern Telegraph Company and Cable & Wireless: the later part of his career was spent as manager for Cable and Wireless on the West Indian island of St Lucia) for the rest of his life. He also served at sea in World War I and World War II, running mobile telecommunications for the British Army in North Africa and then Italy. He married and raised a family. In the film A Night to Remember, Evans was portrayed by Geoffrey Bayldon.

World War I

On 2 July 1913, Californian was docked in Veracruz when a fire erupted in her  3 and 4 holds, sustaining serious damage to herself and her cargo.

Californian continued in normal commercial service until World War I, when the British government took control of her. She was responsible for transporting equipments and troops for the Allies mired in the Battle of Gallipoli.

At 07:45 on 9 November 1915, while en route from Salonica to Marseilles at a speed of 12 knots, with a French torpedo boat escort, she was torpedoed by the German U-boat . The escort tried to take her under tow, but the tow rope broke at 13:20. During a second attempt at 14:15, she was torpedoed again and began to sink quickly. To date, Californians wreck remains undiscovered.

In popular culture
The involvement of the Californian in the sinking of the Titanic is examined in the 2012 BBC TV drama SOSThe Titanic Inquiry. The drama tells the story of the original British Inquiry into the sinking of Titanic, which decided, using the facts that were available at the time, whether the Californian was in near enough proximity to the vessel to rescue some, if not all, of the 1,500 lives lost.

The 2016 novel The Midnight Watch by David Dyer explores the Titanic tragedy from the perspective of the crew of the Californian. The narrative centres around a fictional American reporter who tries to uncover what really happened on board the Californian that fateful night.

References

Bibliography

Further reading 

Butler, Daniel Allen. The Other Side of the Night. Casemate, 2009.
Lee, Paul. The Indifferent Stranger, electronic book, 2008.
Eaton, John P. and Haas, Charles A. Titanic: Triumph and Tragedy (2nd ed.). New York: W. W. Norton & Company, 1995.
Halpern, Samuel. Strangers on the Horizon: Titanic and Californian – A Forensic Approach, 2019.
Lord, Walter. The Night Lives On. Morrow and Company, 1986.
Lynch, Donald and Marschall, Ken. Titanic: An Illustrated History. Hyperion, 1995.
Molony, Senan. Titanic and the Mystery Ship. Tempus Publishing, 2006.
Padfield, Peter. The Titanic and the Californian. The John Day Company, 1965.
Reade, Leslie. The Ship That Stood Still: The Californian and Her Mysterious Role in the Titanic Disaster. W. W. Norton & Co Inc, 1993.
Dyer, David (2016), The Midnight Watch, Atlantic Books, 2016

External links
Californian Crew List with Biographies
Captain Stanley Lord
SS Californian
 
A PV Solves a Puzzle by Senan Molony
The Californian Incident, A Reality Check
The Titanic and the Californian

Steamships of the United Kingdom
Merchant ships of the United Kingdom
RMS Titanic
Ships built in Dundee
Ships sunk by German submarines in World War I
1901 ships
Maritime incidents in 1912
Maritime incidents in 1915
World War I shipwrecks in the Mediterranean Sea